London Police may refer to:

Current
City of London Police, the police force for the square-mile sized district known as the City of London
Metropolitan Police, the police force for Greater London, excluding the City of London
London Police Service, the police force for London, Ontario, Canada

Historical
Bow Street Runners (1749-1839), called London's first professional police force
Marine Police Force (1798-1839), said to be England's first police force, merged into the Metropolitan Police Service

See also 
List of law enforcement agencies in the United Kingdom, Crown Dependencies and British Overseas Territories#National forces and agencies